Ottokár Prohászka (10 October 1858 – 2 April 1927) was a Hungarian Roman Catholic theologian and Bishop of Székesfehérvár from 1905 until his death.

Prohászka was born in Nyitra (today Nitra, Slovakia). He was a prominent anti-Semite, and used literature as an outlet for his hostile opinions. He died in Budapest.

References

External links 
 
 Monori Áron: A numerus clausus és a magyar katolikus sajtó 1919–1920
 Monori Áron: Akikre büszkék vagyunk (Élet és Irodalom, 12 May 2006.)
  Mózessy Gergely cikke Prohászka antiszemitizmusáról
 
 Samu Tamás Gergő: Magyarország apostola és tanítómestere: Prohászka Ottokár
 Prohászka Ottokár (a Székesfehérvári Katolikus Egyházmegye honlapján)

1858 births
1927 deaths
19th-century Hungarian people
19th-century Roman Catholic theologians
20th-century Roman Catholic theologians
Hungarian Roman Catholic theologians
20th-century Roman Catholic bishops in Hungary
Antisemitism in Hungary
Late modern Christian antisemitism
Hungarian people of Czech descent
People from Nitra
Collegium Germanicum et Hungaricum alumni